Legislative elections were held in Honduras in October 1930.

Results

References

Bibliography
Argueta, Mario. Tiburcio Carías: anatomía de una época, 1923-1948. Tegucigalpa: Editorial Guaymuras. 1989. 
Mariñas Otero, Luis.  “La evolución del estado liberal: de la guerra civil a la crisis del 30.” Yankelevich, Pablo, ed.  1990.  Honduras.  México: Instituto de Investigaciones Dr. José María Mora, Universidad de Guadalajara, Nueva Imagen.
Political handbook of the world 1931. New York, 1932.
Stokes, William S. Honduras: an area study in government. Madison: University of Wisconsin Press. 1950. 

Elections in Honduras
Honduras
1930 in Honduras
October 1930 events
Election and referendum articles with incomplete results